The Sports Museum of Aruba is a museum located in Aruba about the achievements of Aruban athletes. It is dedicated to Francisco Chirino.

See also 
 List of museums in Aruba

References 

Museums in Aruba
Sports museums in the Netherlands